Roquette may refer to:

Rocket Lettuce, a green leafy plant commonly used in salads
Roquette Frères, producer of sugarless sweeteners
De la Roquette Islands, Nunavut, Canada
La Roquette, a commune in the Eure département, France
La Roquette-sur-Siagne, a commune in the Alpes-Maritimes département, France
La Roquette-sur-Var, a commune in the Alpes-Maritimes département, France
La Roquette Prisons, prisons in Paris
Marie-Christine Coisne-Roquette (born 1956), French businesswoman
Peter Roquette (born 1927), mathematician
Suzanne Roquette (born 1942), German actress

See also
 La Rouquette, a commune in the Aveyron department in southern France
John Larroquette, American actor
 Roquettes, Haute-Garonne, France; a commune
 Roquetes (disambiguation)
 Roquet (disambiguation)
 Rockettes (disambiguation)
 Rocket (disambiguation)